Ellipanthus is a genus of plants in the family Connaraceae. The generic name is from the Greek meaning "defective flower", referring to the incomplete development of some of the stamens.

Description
Ellipanthus species grow as shrubs or small trees. The twigs are tomentose, especially when young. Inflorescences consist of four or five flowers. The fruits are densely tomentose with a woody pericarp.

Distribution and habitat
Ellipanthus species grow naturally in Africa, Madagascar, Sri Lanka, mainland Southeast Asia and Malesia. Their habitat is lowland mixed dipterocarp forest and mixed swamp forest.

Species
 The Plant List recognises 10 accepted taxa (of species and infraspecific names):
 Ellipanthus beccarii  
 Ellipanthus calophyllus  
 Ellipanthus glabrifolius  
 Ellipanthus hemandradenioides  
 Ellipanthus madagascariensis  
 Ellipanthus razanatsimae  
 Ellipanthus tomentosus  
 var. kingii  
 Ellipanthus unifoliatus  
 Ellipanthus unifoliolatus

References

Connaraceae
Oxalidales genera
Taxa named by Joseph Dalton Hooker